The B99, Bx99, and M99 bus routes formed a temporary night bus service in the New York City boroughs of Manhattan, Brooklyn, and the Bronx. The three bus routes were created to replace overnight subway service during the height of COVID-19 pandemic, while the subway system was closed to the public between 1:00 AM and 5:00 AM. All three routes overlapped in Manhattan allowing customers to easily transfer between services.

The M99 and B99 were created on June 28, 2020; the Bx99 was created on August 5, 2020. All routes stopped running on June 10, 2021, after overnight subway service was restored.

Route descriptions 

Under normal service patterns, the New York City Subway typically runs 24/7 service. As a result of the COVID-19 pandemic in New York City, overnight subway service was suspended between 1:00 AM and 5:00 AM from mid-2020 to mid-2021.

The B99, Bx99, and M99 buses followed routes very similar to the 2 and 4 trains' overnight patterns. The M99 was based out of Michael J. Quill Depot in Midtown, the B99 was based out of East New York Bus Depot in East New York, Brooklyn, and the Bx99 was based out of West Farms Depot in West Farms, Bronx.

B99 
The B99 originated in Manhattan a block south of Columbus Circle. The bus then traveled southbound via the Ninth and Tenth Avenues Line and northbound via the Eighth Avenue Line before reaching 14th Street. After this the B99 used the 14th Street Crosstown Line until turning onto the Fifth and Sixth Avenues (northbound) and Seventh Avenue (southbound) lines. The B99 then followed Canal Street and went over the Manhattan Bridge, arriving into Brooklyn. The bus then followed Flatbush Avenue, and after briefly using Eastern Parkway, the bus turned onto the Nostrand Avenue Line,laid over on Nostrand Avenue (the B99 used it southbound) and New York Avenue (the B99 used it northbound). The bus ended its route near the 2 train terminus at Flatbush Avenue-Brooklyn College on Avenue H.

Bx99 
The Bx99 originated at Spring and Greenwich Streets in Manhattan's West Village. The northbound bus then looped around Spring Street and followed Hudson Street up to 14th Street, while the southbound bus followed Greenwich and West Houston Streets to Seventh Avenue, and then to 14th Street. The Bx99 followed the 14th Street Crosstown Line until using the Ninth and Tenth Avenues Line southbound and Eleventh and Twelfth Avenues Line northbound to 57th Street. The Bx99 then followed the 57th Street Crosstown Line and then the First and Second Avenues Line on First Avenue (northbound) and Second Avenue (southbound), until finally crossing the Third Avenue Bridge (southbound) or Willis Avenue Bridge (northbound), and using East 138th Street to reach Grand Concourse. The Bx99 bus then followed the Grand Concourse Line, for a short distance East Tremont Avenue, and then Jerome Avenue before reaching its final stop at the 4 train terminus Woodlawn in Norwood, Bronx, Bronx.

M99 
The M99 originated in Manhattan at West 42nd Street Pier near the West Midtown Ferry Terminal and followed 42nd Street for some time before using the Ninth and Tenth Avenues Line southbound and Eleventh and Twelfth Avenues Line northbound until reaching 14th Street. The M99 then used the 14th Street Crosstown Line until turning onto the Fifth and Sixth Avenues (northbound) and Seventh Avenue (southbound) lines. The M99 then followed Canal Street and went over the Manhattan Bridge, arriving into Brooklyn. The bus then traversed Flatbush Avenue and the Fulton Street Line on Fulton Street, and at Rockaway Avenue turned onto the Wilson Avenue Line and then later onto the Sumner and Wilson Avenues Line on New Lots Avenue. The bus terminated at the 4 train terminus at New Lots Avenue in New Lots, Brooklyn.

History 

After the Metropolitan Transportation Authority of New York cut overnight subway services during the COVID-19 pandemic, mayor Bill de Blasio announced that they would make a new alternative for the 2 and 4 trains overnight. On June 28, 2020, the M99 and B99 routes were created, followed on August 5 by the Bx99. These new bus routes would be free of charge.

When new protective barriers were installed and the Metropolitan Transportation Authority started charging fares again in fall 2020, the B99, Bx99, and M99 buses required a fare to ride as well. Overnight subway service resumed on May 17, 2021. On June 10, B99, Bx99, and M99 bus service was discontinued.

Notes

References 

2020 introductions
099
099
099
MTA Regional Bus routes